Nawal Soufi (Arabic: نوال الصوفي ; born 1988 in Morocco) is a Moroccan-Italian social worker and human rights activist. She also has been active in immigration and is a sympathizer of the Palestinian cause.

Biography 
Soufi was born in Morocco of Moroccan parents but just after a few weeks after the birth they moved to Catania at the foot of Etna in Italy. She was only fourteen when she began her social career helping Moroccan immigrants and Italian homeless to survive in their daily lives. she continued her social work activities when she grew up. She earned a degree in political science and international relations, while working part-time as an interpreter in Sicilian courts and prisons.

She was affected by the Palestinian struggle and the Arab Spring. In December 2012 she traveled to Syria and headed a humanitarian convoy which helped about 800 families there. She offered her help for the Syrians who were trying to take refuge in Italy.

Activities 
Soufi became known in 2013 when she saved a boat lost in the Mediterranean Sea, with hundreds of Syrian refugees aboard, in danger of getting drowned. She received a call demanding rescue from one of the immigrants.

Honored by this achievement she made aid for illegal migrants her daily struggle. In this way she managed to successfully save more than 2 million migrants, lost at sea, to that date.

Awards 
Soufi has won several awards for the documentaries she made in Syria and Libya  in 2014. These include the " Pioneer Woman - Donna di Frontiera " and "Border Woman" Award from the jurors of the Marzamemi International Frontier Film Festival.

Soufi was awarded the European Citizens' Prize in 2016. She won the prize of initiative artisans of hope in 2017 chaired by Emir Mohammed bin Rashid Al Maktoum in Dubai a distinction aimed at promoting Arab skills working for positive change through projects and initiatives.

The remarkable intention of a young woman is the subject of a book Nawal, the angel of refugees, released in 2015 in Italy.

References

Italian political people
Italian human rights activists
1988 births
Living people
Recipients of the European Citizen's Prize